San San or San san may refer to:

 San San, Portland, Jamaica, a town in the parish of Portland in Jamaica
 San San River, a river of Panama
 San San (horse), an American-bred Thoroughbred racehorse
 San san (Go), a term in the board game Go

See also
 
 San Sano, a village in Tuscany, Italy
 Sansan (disambiguation)